The Governor of the Bangko Sentral ng Pilipinas (Filipino: Tagapangasiwa ng Bangko Sentral ng Pilipinas) is the chief executive officer of the Bangko Sentral ng Pilipinas, the Philippines' central bank. This position succeeds and replaces the earlier post of Governor of the Central Bank of the Philippines.

On June 30, 2022, President Bongbong Marcos appointed Felipe Medalla as the sixth Governor of the Bangko Sentral ng Pilipinas, serving the unexpired term of his predecessor (which will end in July 2023), Benjamin Diokno, who was subsequently appointed as Secretary of Finance.

Roles with other agencies
He also serves as the chairman and principal representative of the Monetary Board; chairman of Anti-Money Laundering Council and Philippine International Convention Center; vice-chairman of the Governing Council of Agriculture Credit Policy Council; member of the Capital Market Development Council, Export Development Council, PhilExport board of trustees, and Philippine Export-Import Credit Agency; and director of Philippine Deposit Insurance Corporation, National Development Council, and National Home Mortgage Finance Corporation.

Powers and duties
His powers and duties as the chief executive officer of the Bangko Sentral shall be to:

Prepare the agenda for the meetings of the Monetary Board and to submit for the consideration of the Board the policies and measures that he believes to be necessary to carry out the purposes and provisions of said Act;
Execute and administer the policies and measures approved by the Monetary Board;
Direct and supervise the operations and internal administration of the Bangko Sentral. The Governor may delegate certain of his administrative responsibilities to other officers or may assign specific tasks or responsibilities to any full-time member of the Monetary Board without additional remuneration or allowance whenever he may deem fit or subject to such rules and regulations as the Monetary Board may prescribe;
Appoint and fix the remunerations and other emoluments of personnel below the rank of a department head in accordance with the position and compensation plans approved by the Monetary Board, as well as to impose disciplinary measures upon personnel of the Bangko Sentral, subject to the provisions of Section 15(c) of said Act: Provided, That removal of personnel shall be with the approval of the Monetary Board;
Render opinions, decisions, or rulings, which shall be final and executory until reversed or modified by the Monetary Board, on matters regarding application or enforcement of laws pertaining to institutions supervised by the Bangko Sentral and laws pertaining to quasi-banks, as well as regulations, policies or instructions issued by the Monetary Board, and the implementation thereof; and
Exercise such other powers as may be vested in him by the Monetary Board.

In capacity as the principal representative of Bangko Sentral and the Monetary Board and in accordance with the instructions of the Monetary Board, he shall be empowered to:

Represent the Monetary Board and the Bangko Sentral in all dealings with other offices, agencies and instrumentalities of the Government, and all other persons or entities, public or private, whether domestic, foreign or international;
Sign contracts entered into by the Bangko Sentral, notes and securities issued by the Bangko Sentral, all reports, balance sheets, profit and loss statements, correspondence, and other documents of the Bangko Sentral;
Represent the Bangko Sentral, either personally or through counsel,   including private counsel, as may be authorized by the Monetary Board, in any legal proceedings, action or specialized legal studies; and
Delegate his power to represent the Bangko Sentral, to other officers upon his own responsibility: Provided, however, That in order to preserve the integrity and the prestige of his office, the Governor of the Bangko Sentral may choose not to participate in preliminary discussions with any multilateral banking or financial institution on any negotiations for the Government within or outside the Philippines.    During the negotiations, he may instead be represented by a permanent negotiator.

List of governors of Bangko Sentral

*Died in office

References

Governors of the Bangko Sentral ng Pilipinas
Pilipinas, Bangko Sentral ng